Sharon Ryer Davis (born May 6, 1954) is an American author who served as first lady of California from 1999 to 2003. She is the wife of former California governor Gray Davis. She previously served as second lady of California from 1995 to 1999. Davis is also a former Miss Santee and the author of the children's book, The Adventures of Capitol Kitty.

Early life
Davis attended Santana High School in Santee, California. While there, she entered the Miss Santee contest and won. Shortly after high school she began working at Pacific Southwest Airlines as a flight attendant.

Marriage
Sharon met Gray Davis in 1979 while he was Chief of Staff for then California Governor Jerry Brown.

First Lady of California
As First Lady, Davis was active in children's health and education, especially literacy, creating the Governor's Book Fund, which provided funds for school libraries. She wrote a children's book titled The Adventures of Capitol Kitty to help pay for the fund. She eventually helped raise 750,000 dollars. During the 2000 United States presidential election, her husband was rumored to be a potential vice presidential running mate for Al Gore, but Davis turned it down, with the position eventually going to Joe Lieberman. Davis was also rumored to be a potential presidential candidate in 2004. She left the office of First Lady in November 2003, after her husband's recall.

References

1954 births
Living people
First Ladies and Gentlemen of California
American children's writers
American beauty pageant winners
American health activists
California Democrats
People from Santee, California
American women children's writers
People from Brentwood, Los Angeles
Activists from California
21st-century American women